Madame Vastra, Jenny Flint, and Strax (informally known as the Paternoster Gang, together with the Doctor), are a trio of recurring fictional characters in the British science fiction television series Doctor Who, created by Steven Moffat and portrayed, respectively, by Neve McIntosh, Catrin Stewart, and Dan Starkey.

The three characters first appear in the sixth series episode "A Good Man Goes to War." Madame Vastra (a Silurian) and Jenny Flint (a human) are a married couple. In later stories we see them living in London during the 19th century. Strax, a Sontaran, is seen in his first appearance to be acting as a nurse, caring for wounded soldiers on another planet. They are all recruited by the Eleventh Doctor to help him rescue Amy Pond. Despite the success of the effort, Strax apparently dies in the battle. He is, however, shown to be awakened by Vastra and Flint a couple of days later, in the webisode "The Battle of Demons Run: Two Days Later"; he then became their butler in the 19th century.

Since their first appearance, the trio have appeared various times to help the Doctor, even having a central role in the first half of "The Crimson Horror" (2013). Their last episode was 2014's "Deep Breath", the first episode starring the Twelfth Doctor.

They also have their own spin-off novella, Devil in the Smoke (2012), and spin-off novel, Silhouette (2014), and the trio have appeared in several online "minisodes", with Strax additionally appearing in a series of "Field Report" videos posted to the Doctor Who website. In 2014, they appeared without the Doctor in the Doctor Who Magazine comic strip in the storyline The Crystal Throne (DWM #475–476). Since 2015, an ongoing series of short stories and a comic strip titled Strax and the Time Shark, featuring the three characters, has been a regular feature in Doctor Who Adventures magazine. The three characters became popular with audiences, with the presence of an inter-species same-sex couple also leading to some attention.

Biography

Background

Vastra
Vastra is a female Silurian warrior from prehistoric Earth who was awakened from hibernation in the 19th century when her lair was disturbed during the construction of the London Underground. Initially enraged, she slaughtered five commuters before being pacified by the Doctor. She eventually overcame her race's hatred of humans and joined London society. She became a consulting detective to Scotland Yard, and a possible inspiration for the Sherlock Holmes stories. Amongst her unseen adventures is her capture of Jack the Ripper, whom she eats (she mentions in "A Good Man Goes to War" that she found him "stringy, but tasty all the same"). She hired a maid, Jenny Flint, who assists her in her investigations and who is also married to her.

Jenny Flint
Jenny's backstory in "The Battle of Demons Run: Two Days Later" (2013) shows she was turned away from her family because of her "preferences in companionship", and saved from attackers by Vastra, who took her on as an employee. The Doctor was present at their initial meeting, during which Vastra recounts in "The Name of the Doctor" (2013) that he saved Jenny's life. She shows herself to have acquired extremely formidable skills as a hand-to-hand combatant and a swordswoman. She is shown in all of her appearances to be entirely comfortable with post-19th century technologies, time travel, and the TARDIS; she is repeatedly seen using technology devices and, in the episode "Deep Breath", she is seen wearing and using the Sonic Gauntlet designed for that episode.

Strax
Strax is a member of the alien warrior race, the Sontarans. Strax was forced to serve as a nurse, healing the injured as a punishment for being defeated by the Doctor during the Sontaran invasion of Earth. This is contrary to the Sontaran's warrior instincts and mentality and as such, Strax has been known to occasionally slip back to his Sontaran ways and mannerisms. In "A Good Man Goes to War", he states that he is nearly 12, suggesting that this is quite old for a Sontaran. Running jokes include Strax's inability to tell the difference between genders and his obsession with using violent tactics.

Appearances

Television
"A Good Man Goes to War" (2011)
"The Snowmen" (2012)
"The Crimson Horror" (2013)
"The Name of the Doctor" (2013)
"Deep Breath" (2014)

Storylines
In their first appearance in "A Good Man Goes to War", the three, along with others who owe him favours, are chosen by the Eleventh Doctor to help him save Amy Pond from Madame Kovarian and the Order of the Headless Monks at Demons Run. At the time, Strax is a Sontaran "nurse" taking care of the wounded soldiers on a battlefield as part of a penance imposed on him. Before he can answer Captain Harcourt as to who came up with this penance, the Doctor arrives in his TARDIS to take him to Demons Run. They fight together against their enemies and succeed in saving Amy, but Strax is mortally wounded and appears to die after saying his last words to Rory Williams.

In "The Battle of Demons Run: Two Days Later", a webcast set two days after the events of "A Good Man Goes to War", Strax is awakened by Vastra and Jenny, after they heal his wounds, and accepts their proposition to join them in London in 1888. He subsequently becomes their butler.

They then appear in "The Snowmen" (2012), trying to convince the Eleventh Doctor to come out of retirement (into which he has retreated after losing Amy and Rory in "The Angels Take Manhattan"). They help the Doctor's future new companion Clara Oswald to find him and support them in their fight against the Great Intelligence. A high fall kills Clara, whose death indirectly lets the Doctor defeat the Great Intelligence.

The trio — and more particularly Jenny — have a central role in the first half of "The Crimson Horror" (2013), set in 1893, in which they investigate a series of strange deaths. They travel to Yorkshire, where Jenny infiltrates a suspect community called Sweetville, led by Mrs Gillyflower. She finds the Eleventh Doctor, kept prisoner in Sweetville, and the trio reunites to help him defeat Mrs Gillyflower, by sabotaging the rocket she was planning to use to poison the skies. They discover that Clara appears to be alive (the Doctor's companion being another version of the one seen in "The Snowmen", coming from another era), but the Doctor does not explain why to Jenny, as he himself does not know the answer at this time.

The three characters reappear in the seventh series finale "The Name of the Doctor", where they organise a meeting in a dream with Clara and River Song. During the "conference call", the three are captured by the Whisper Men, minions of the Great Intelligence, who uses them as bait to bring the Eleventh Doctor to his tomb on the planet Trenzalore. The Doctor unhesitatingly goes to rescue them, recalling their caring and concern for him in "The Snowmen" and feeling a duty towards them. After the Doctor arrives on Trenzalore with Clara, the Great Intelligence scatters itself across the Doctor's timeline to destroy him. As history changes, Jenny disappears and Strax forgets his friendship with Vastra and attacks her, forcing her to defend herself. She points a weapon at him and it glows, but Strax disappears suddenly, leaving Vastra bewildered and calling his name. After Clara enters the timestream to save the Doctor and undo the Great Intelligence's changes to history, Jenny and Strax are restored.

In "Deep Breath", the first episode of the eighth series, Vastra, Jenny, and Strax arrive in central London to witness a dinosaur marching through the city and proceeding to cough up the TARDIS. Upon finding the TARDIS, they find emerging from it a recently regenerated Twelfth Doctor, who falls unconscious. The three, along with Clara, take him back to their home to rest, while they attempt to solve the problem of the dinosaur. However, the Doctor soon wakes up and tries to solve it himself, only to witness the dinosaur spontaneously combust, and Vastra informs the Doctor that there have been similar murders recently. The Doctor vanishes thereafter and Clara becomes a temporary member of the Paternoster Gang, working with them in an effort to locate the Doctor and investigate the dinosaur's death. Together, they find a message in a newspaper directed at Clara, leading to her reunion with the Doctor. The Doctor and Clara go searching for the culprit; when they are about to be killed by robots, the Paternoster Gang rescue them, fighting along with Clara until the Doctor defeats their leader, leading all robots to be deactivated and saving his friends. After the Doctor takes off, leaving Clara in Victorian London, Clara asks Vastra if she can stay with them. Vastra states that she is of course welcome, but she should have no doubt of the Doctor's return. The Doctor then indeed comes back to pick her up, and they leave the house to bring Clara back home.

Audio drama
Strax first appeared in Jago & Litefoot in 2015 alongside Henry Gordon Jago (Christopher Benjamin) and George Litefoot (Trevor Baxter). In 2017, Neve McIntosh joined Big Finish starring in The Churchill Years range. All three featured together in audio for the first time in 2019's The Eighth of March, which also served as Jenny Flint's debut in audio form.

In 2019, four sets titled The Paternoster Gang were to be released featuring all three members. Heritage 1, Heritage 2, Heritage 3, and Heritage 4 were released in June 2019, October 2019, March 2020 and October 2020, respectively.

List of audios
 "The Haunting" – Jago & Litefoot & Strax (2015) – Strax
 "Young Winston" – The Churchill Years Volume 2 (2018) – Madame Vastra
 "The Big Blue Book" – The Eighth of March (2019) – Madame Vastra, Jenny Flint, and Strax
 The Paternoster Gang – Heritage (2019–20) – Madame Vastra, Jenny Flint, and Strax

Casting and development

McIntosh previously appeared in the series portraying two other Silurian female characters, sisters Alaya and Restac, in the two-part story "The Hungry Earth"/"Cold Blood" (2010).

Starkey previously played Commander Skorr, one of the Sontarans, in the two-part story re-introducing the species, "The Sontaran Stratagem"/"The Poison Sky" (2008). He also portrayed another Sontaran character in "The End of Time" (2009–10) and in between appearances as Strax in "The Name of the Doctor" (2013) and "Deep Breath" (2014), he played two more Sontarans in "The Time of the Doctor" (2013).

In November 2013, the long-running children's show Blue Peter announced a competition for fans aged 6–15 to design 'sonic devices' for the characters, with the three winning designs appearing in Series 8. The following month the winning entries were revealed as a Sonic Hatpin, Sonic Gauntlet, and Sonic Lorgnette for Vastra, Jenny, and Strax respectively. The devices were featured in "Deep Breath".

In an interview in the Doctor Who Magazine issue dated April 2015, Steven Moffat said that the BBC suggested a spin-off series about the characters, but he rejected the idea due to his other commitments.

Reception

Critical reception
The three characters have met with positive reviews from critics who praised their chemistry, as well as the humour concerning Strax and his Sontaran warrior habits, often at odds with the context. Nick Setchfield of SFX called Strax "just the right side of crowdpleasing." Discussing their first appearance in "A Good Man Goes to War", Dan Martin from The Guardian called the three "the finest thing about it, lighting up the screen with every appearance." He called their return in "The Snowmen" wonderful, calling Strax "scene-stealingly adorable". He also stated "with marriage equality so much on the agenda, the divine Vastra and Jenny can only be a good thing to have on screens at tea time."

Notes

References

External links

Doctor Who aliens
Female characters in television
Fictional butlers
Fictional clones
Fictional criminologists
Fictional lesbians
Fictional LGBT characters in television
Fictional LGBT couples
Fictional maids
Fictional married couples
Fictional nurses
Fictional people from London
Fictional people from the 19th-century
Fictional private investigators
Fictional reptilians
Fictional trios
Fictional female scientists
Male characters in television
Recurring characters in Doctor Who
Television characters introduced in 2011